104.7 RCFM (DZRG 104.7 MHz) is an FM station owned and operated by Rainbow Connection Civic Group. Its studios and transmitter are located at Commercial Building, National Highway, San Antonio, Zambales.

References

External links
RCFM FB Page

Radio stations in Olongapo